Speedway Boulevard is the sole self-titled album by the rock band Speedway Boulevard. The album was released in 1980 on Epic Records.

Track listing 
Track listing adopted from Discogs.

Personnel 

 Roy Herring Jr. - Percussion, piano, vocals
 Jordan Rudess- Keyboards
 Gregg Hoffman- Guitar, vocals
 Dennis Feldman- Bass, vocals
 Glenn Dove- Drums, percussion

Production 

 Jeffry Katz and Jerry Kasenetz- Production
 Michael Earls- Engineer

References 

1980 albums